This is a list of the National Register of Historic Places listings in Lamar County, Texas.

This is intended to be a complete list of properties and districts listed on the National Register of Historic Places in Lamar County, Texas. There are three districts and 37 individual properties listed on the National Register in the county. One individually listed property is also designated a State Historic Site, a State Antiquities Landmark (SAL), a Recorded Texas Historic Landmark (RTHL), and is part of a historic district that contains additional RTHLs. Five individually listed properties are also RTHLs, and another district contains more SALs and RTHLs.

Current listings

The publicly disclosed locations of National Register properties and districts may be seen in a mapping service provided.

|}

See also

National Register of Historic Places listings in Texas
Recorded Texas Historic Landmarks in Lamar County

References

External links

Registered Historic Places
Lamar County
Buildings and structures in Lamar County, Texas